The Federal Government College, Ijanikin is a co-educational secondary school in Ijanikin, Lagos, Nigeria. It was established by the Federal give
Ministry of Education in 1975. The idea of this college in Lagos was conceived in the minds of the authorities of the Federal Ministry of Education early in 1974 when they thought it necessary to have one co-educational institution for Lagos state as there were in all the then 12 states of the Federation.

The college was founded by the Federal Ministry of Education in line with the Federal Government’s intention to establish in each state of the federation one co-educational as well as one girls’ secondary school. At inception, the college opened with 116 Form One and 45 Lower Six students with a teaching staff of 20. The Form One students were made up of 64 boys and 52 girls, while the Lower Six students consisted of 24 boys and 21 girls. Both the students and staff were distributed into four houses namely: Eagle, Elephant, Peacock and Tiger. As of 2005 the college had a population of 2,585 students and 492 teaching and non-teaching staff.
The period between 1975 and 1980 was marked with growing pains ranging from lack of a permanent facility and other infrastructural issues. At first, the school had classes at the then government Trade Center, Yaba while the students lived in rented private houses in Igbobi, Lagos (near the Igbobi College campus).
At the beginning of the 1976-77 academic session, classes were held inside temporary classroom buildings built on the premises of the Lagos State Government College, Ojo, now the site of the Lagos State University (LASU). During this period the girls lived within the same compound in Ojo, while the boys remained in the Igbobi dormitory facility, travelling by a school bus to and from Ojo. This arrangement was interrupted between January and March, 1977 due to heavy traffic along the Lagos-Badagry Expressway as a result of the World Black and African Festival of Arts and Culture (FESTAC ‘77), an international trade show hosted by Nigeria. Consequently, the school, along with the girl's dormitory, was moved back to the Yaba Trade Center.

As part of an interim arrangement for the college, Science Practicals (Laboratory) were conducted for the Lower Six and Upper Six Students at the National Technical Teachers’ College, Lagos between October, 1975 and April, 1977. Starting in April 1977, the boys were relocated to new buildings at Satellite Town, the residential complex built and used during the prior FESTAC ’77 event, while the girls were moved back to the Lagos State facility in Ojo. The boys were transported daily by bus from Satellite Town to and from classrooms in Ojo. This situation continued until late in September 1980 when the school moved to its permanent and present site at Ijanikin.

The school commenced the 1980-81 academic session in Ijanikin with a transformation in the school administration and the boarding house system. First, the post of the Vice Principal was broken into two functional roles, namely the Vice Principal of Administration and the Vice Principal of Academics. Second, the school boarding house groupings (with corresponding house colors) were expanded from the original four groups (named after animals) to six groups (named after historical persons) as follows:

Dan-Fodio (Green) - previously Eagle
Elkanemi (Brown) - previously Elephant
Jaja (Blue) - previously Peacock
Macaulay (Purple)
Moremi (Yellow)
Nnamdi Azikwe (Orange) 
Oduduwa (Red) - previously Tiger

All the students were redistributed into these six boarding houses. As both the students and staff population increased, and in order to facilitate effective administration and excellent performance, the posts of Officer-in-Charge (O/C) Administration and Officer-in-Charge (O/C) Academic were created. To further enhance effectiveness, more O/C’s were later appointed in 1995.

The school has continued to make great strides. The population of the school in terms of staff and students has greatly expanded. There has been an increase in the infra-structural facilities with more Parent Teacher Association (PTA) participation. In fact, the PTA has provided many facilities for the college, among which are classroom buildings, hostel buildings, sports pavilion, and water wells. Academically the college has won many laurels—the college emerged first overall among the first generation of federal unity colleges.

Past Principals

Dr. Mrs. O.A.U Essien (February 2017 to October 2020)

Mrs. A.A Ibukun (January 2011 to February 2017)

Mrs Okebukola (September 2006 to August 2011)

Mr. J. A. Owoseye (June 2004 to August 2006)

Mrs. O. O. Fagbayi (November 1996 to June 2004)

Mrs. F. S. Robinson (February 1995 to November 1996)

Mrs. B. A. Mowoe (September 1991 to February 1995)

Mrs. O. O. Abisogun-Alo (August 1986 to September 1991)

Mr. M. B. Ligali (September 1985 to August 1986)

Mr. J. O. Abolade (August 1980 to September 1985)

Mrs. A. A. Kafaru (December 1977 to August 1980)

Mrs T. E. Chukuma  - School Inaugural Principal (October 1975 to December 1977)

References
 FGC Friends: An F.G.C classmate and old student Network Alumni Website 
FGCL
 https://web.archive.org/web/20130820071531/http://fgclalumni.org/the_school.html
http://www.fgclagos.org.ng

Schools in Lagos
Secondary schools in Lagos State
Government schools in Nigeria
1975 establishments in Nigeria
Educational institutions established in 1975